Tibor Szalay Csikos is a former Hungarian football player.

Career statistics

Club

Notes

References

1938 births
Living people
Hungarians in Slovakia
People from Nové Zámky District
Sportspeople from the Nitra Region
Hungarian footballers
Hungarian expatriate footballers
Association football midfielders
MTK Budapest FC players
FK Austria Wien players
Sevilla FC players
FC Barcelona players
New York Hungaria players
Real Murcia players
Beşiktaş J.K. footballers
Philadelphia Spartans players
Houston Stars players
Kansas City Spurs players
Philadelphia Ukrainians players
Washington Darts players
German-American Soccer League players
National Professional Soccer League (1967) players
North American Soccer League (1968–1984) players
American Soccer League (1933–1983) players
Expatriate footballers in Austria
Hungarian expatriate sportspeople in Austria
Expatriate footballers in Spain
Hungarian expatriate sportspeople in Spain
Expatriate soccer players in the United States
Hungarian expatriate sportspeople in the United States
Expatriate footballers in Turkey
Hungarian expatriate sportspeople in Turkey